Harshbarger is a surname. Notable people with the surname include:

Dema Harshbarger (1884–1964), American concert promoter, talent agent
Diana Harshbarger (born 1960), American politician and pharmacist from Tennessee
Eric Harshbarger, American puzzle designer
Jason Harshbarger (born 1974), American politician from West Virginia
Jo Harshbarger (born 1956), American swimmer
Julie Harshbarger (born 1985), American football player
Mary Beth Harshbarger (born 1965), American hunter acquitted of murder
Sallie Foster Harshbarger (1874–1958), American clubwoman
Scott Harshbarger (born 1941), American lawyer and politician from Massachusetts

Surnames
Surnames of German origin
Surnames of Swiss origin
German-language surnames